The Jerusalem Talmud (often  for short), also known as the Palestinian Talmud or Talmud of the Land of Israel, is a collection of rabbinic notes on the second-century Jewish oral tradition known as the Mishnah. Naming this version of the Talmud after Palestine or the Land of Israel rather than Jerusalemis considered more accurate, as the text originated mainly from Galilee in Byzantine Palaestina Secunda rather than from Jerusalem, where no Jews lived at the time.

The Jerusalem Talmud predates its counterpart, the Babylonian Talmud (known in Hebrew as the ), by about 200 years,  and is written primarily in Jewish Palestinian Aramaic. Both versions of the Talmud have two parts, the Mishnah (of which there is only one version), which was finalized by Judah ha-Nasi around the year 200 CE, and either the Babylonian or the Jerusalem Gemara. The Gemara is what differentiates the Jerusalem Talmud from its Babylonian counterpart. The Jerusalem Gemara contains the written discussions of generations of rabbis of the Talmudic Academies in Syria Palaestina at Tiberias and Caesarea, and was compiled into book form in around 350–400 CE.

Place and date of composition 
The Jerusalem Talmud probably originated in Tiberias in the School of Johanan bar Nappaha. It is a compilation of teachings of the schools of Tiberias, Sepphoris and Caesarea. It is written largely in Jewish Palestinian Aramaic, a Western Aramaic variety that differs from its Babylonian counterpart.

This Talmud is a synopsis of the analysis of the Mishnah that was developed over the course of nearly 200 years by the Talmudic Academies in Syria Palaestina (principally those of Tiberias and Caesarea). Because of their location, the sages of these Academies devoted considerable attention to analysis of the agricultural laws of the Land of Israel. Traditionally, the redaction of this Talmud was thought to have been brought to an abrupt end around 425, when Theodosius II suppressed the Nasi of the Sanhedrin and put an end to the practice of semikhah (formal scholarly ordination). The redaction of the Jerusalem Talmud was done to codify the laws of the Sanhedrin as the redaction of the Mishnah had similarly done during the time of Judah ha-Nasi. It was thought that the compilers of the Jerusalem Talmud worked to collect the rulings of the Sanhedrin and lacked the time to produce a work of the quality they had intended and that this is the reason why the Gemara do not comment upon the whole Mishnah, or that certain sections were lost.

In recent years scholars have come to doubt the causal link between the abolition of the Nasi and the seeming incompletion of the final redaction. It was once thought that no evidence exists of Amoraim activity in Syria Palaestina after the 370s, indicating that the final redaction of the Jerusalem Talmud likely took place in the late fourth or early fifth century. However, Professor Hillel Newman points to evidence of Amoraic activity in the 380s. The Jerusalem Talmud (Sanhedrin 3:5) records that Rabbi Mana II instructed the bakers of Sepphoris to bake bread (either on the Sabbath or Passover) when a certain Proqla arrived. This individual should be identified with Proculus (prefect of Constantinople), who was governor of Palestine in c. 380.

Contents and pagination
In the initial Venice edition, the Jerusalem Talmud was published in four volumes, corresponding to separate sedarim of the Mishnah. Page numbers are by volume as follows:

 Zeraim: Berakhot (2a-14d); Pe'ah (15a-21b); Demai (21c-26c); Kilayim (26d-32d); Sheviit (33a-39d); Terumot (40a-48b); Maasrot (48c-52a); Maaser Sheni (52b-58d); Hallah (57a-60b); Orlah (60c-63b); Bikkurim (63c-65d).
 Moed: Shabbat (2a-18a); Eruvin (18a-26d); Pesachim (27a-37d); Yoma (38a-45c); Shekalim (45c-51b); Sukkah (51c-55d); Rosh ha-Shanah (56a-59d); Beẓah (59d-63b), Ta'anit (63c-69c); Megillah (69d-75d); Ḥagigah (75d-79d); Mo'ed Ḳaṭan (80a-83d).
 Nashim: Yebamot (2a-15a); Sotah (15a-24c); Ketuvot (24c-36b); Nedarim (36c-42d); Gittin (43a-50d); Nazir (51a-58a); Kiddushin (58a-66d).
 Nezikin (and Tohorot): Bava Kamma (2a-7c); Bava Metziah (7c-12c); Bava Batra (12d-17d); Sanhedrin (17d-30c); Makkot (30d-32b); Shevuot (32c-38d); Avodah Zarah (39a-45b); Horayot (45c-48c); Niddah (48d-51b).

Each page was printed as a folio, thus it contains four sub-pages (i.e. 7a, 7b, 7c, 7d), in contrast to the Babylonian Talmud which only has two sub-pages (7a, 7b).

In addition, each chapter of the Jerusalem Talmud (paralleling a chapter of Mishnah) is divided into "halachot"; each "halacha" is the commentary on a single short passage of Mishnah. Passages in the Jerusalem Talmud are generally references by a combination of chapter and halacha (i.e. Yerushalmi Sotah 1:1), by a page in the Venice edition (i.e. Yerushalmi Sotah 15a), or both (Yerushalmi Sotah 1:1 15a).

Missing sections
In addition to the sedarim of Tohorot (except Niddah) and Kodashim, several tractates and parts of tractates are missing from the Jerusalem Talmud. The last four chapters of Shabbat, and the last chapter of Makkot, are missing. Niddah ends abruptly after the first lines of chapter 4. Tractates Avot and Eduyot are missing from both the Jerusalem and Babylonian Talmuds. Tractate Shekalim to the Jerusalem Talmud appears not only in the Jerusalem Talmud but also in printings of the Babylonian Talmud.

According to the Jewish Encyclopedia,

Text editions 
The Leiden Jerusalem Talmud (Or. 4720) is today the only extant complete manuscript of the Jerusalem Talmud. It was copied in 1289 by Rabbi Jehiel ben Jekuthiel Anav and shows elements of a later recension. The additions which are added in the biblical glosses of the Leiden manuscript do not appear in extant fragments of the same Talmudic tractates found in Yemen, additions which are now incorporated in every printed edition of the Jerusalem Talmud. These Yemenite fragments, a consequence of isolation the Yemenite community, are important as source material (as evidenced below).

The Leiden manuscript is important in that it preserves some earlier variants to textual readings, such as in Tractate Pesachim 10:3 (70a), which brings down the old Hebrew word for charoseth (the sweet relish eaten at Passover), viz. dūkeh, instead of rūbeh/rabah, saying with a play on words: “The members of Isse's household would say in the name of Isse: Why is it called dūkeh? It is because she pounds [the spiced ingredients] with him.” The Hebrew word for "pound" is dakh, which rules out the spelling of rabah, as found in the printed editions. Yemenite Jews still call it dūkeh.

Among the Hebrew manuscripts held in the Vatican Library is a late 13th-century – early 14th-century copy of Tractate Sotah and the complete Seder Zera'im for the Jerusalem Talmud (Vat. ebr. 133): Berakhot, Peah, Demai, Kilayim, Sheviit, Terumot, Maaserot, Maaser Sheni, Ḥallah and Orlah (without the Mishnah for the Tractates, excepting only the Mishnah to the 2nd chapter of Berakhot). L. Ginzberg printed variant readings from this manuscript on pp. 347–372 at the end of his Fragments of the Yerushalmi (New York 1909). S. Lieberman printed variants at the end of his essay, ʿAl ha-Yerushalmi (Hebrew), Jerusalem 1929. Both editors noted that this manuscript is full of gross errors but also retains some valuable readings.

Comparison to Babylonian Talmud 

There are significant differences between the two Talmud compilations. The language of the Jerusalem Talmud is Jewish Palestinian Aramaic, a Western Aramaic dialect which differs from that of the Babylonian. The Jerusalem Talmud is often fragmentary and difficult to read, even for experienced Talmudists. The redaction of the Babylonian Talmud, on the other hand, is more careful and precise. The traditional explanation for this difference was the idea that the redactors of the Jerusalem Talmud had to finish their work abruptly. A more probable explanation is the fact that the Babylonian Talmud wasn't redacted for at least another 200 years, in which a broad discursive framework was created. The law as laid down in the two compilations is basically similar, except in emphasis and in minor details. In a novel view, David Weiss Halivni describes the longer discursive passages in the Babylonian Talmud as the "Stammaitic" layer of redaction, and believe that it was added later than the rest: if one were to remove the "Stammaitic" passages, the remaining text would be quite similar in character to the Jerusalem Talmud.

Neither the Jerusalem nor the Babylonian Talmud covers the entire Mishnah: for example, a Babylonian Gemara exists only for 37 out of the 63 tractates of the Mishnah. In particular:
 The Jerusalem Talmud covers all the tractates of Zeraim, while the Babylonian Talmud covers only tractate Berachot. The reason might be that most laws from the Orders Zeraim (agricultural laws limited to the land of Israel) had little practical relevance in Babylonia and were therefore not included. The Jerusalem Talmud has a greater focus on the Land of Israel and the Torah's agricultural laws pertaining to the land because it was written in the Land of Israel where the laws applied.
 The Jerusalem Talmud does not cover the Mishnaic order of Kodashim, which deals with sacrificial rites and laws pertaining to the Temple, while the Babylonian Talmud does cover it. It is not clear why this is, as the laws were not directly applicable in either country following the Temple's 70 CE destruction.
 In both Talmuds, only one tractate of Tohorot (ritual purity laws related to the Temple and sacrificial system) is examined, since the other tractates deal exclusively with Temple-related laws of ritual purity.

The Babylonian Talmud records the opinions of the rabbis of Israel as well as of those of Babylonia, while the Jerusalem Talmud seldom cites the Babylonian rabbis. The Babylonian version contains the opinions of more generations because of its later date of completion. For both these reasons, it is regarded as a more comprehensive collection of the opinions available. On the other hand, because of the centuries of redaction between the composition of the Jerusalem and the Babylonian Talmud, the opinions of early amoraim might be closer to their original form in the Jerusalem Talmud.

Daf Yomi Yerushalmi 
At the sixth World Congress of the World Agudath Israel which took place in Jerusalem in 1980, a proclamation was made by Rabbi Simcha Bunim Alter, the sixth Gerrer Rebbe, to start a daily study of the Jerusalem Talmud. The Yerushalmi Daf Yomi program takes approx. 4.25 years or 51 months. Unlike the Daf Yomi Bavli cycle, the Yerushalmi cycle skips both Yom Kippur and Tisha B'Av. The page numbers are according to the Vilna Edition which is used since 1900. In 2012, Oz Vehadar and ArtScroll publications created a new page layout of the Talmud Yerushalmi; the page number of the Vilna edition is indicated at the top of each page.

Influence 
The influence of the Babylonian Talmud has been far greater than that of the Jerusalem Talmud. In the main, this is because the influence and prestige of the Jewish community of Israel steadily declined in contrast with the Babylonian community in the years after the redaction of the Talmud and continuing until the Gaonic era. Furthermore, the editing of the Babylonian Talmud was superior to that of the Jerusalem version, making it more accessible and readily usable. Hai ben Sherira, on the preeminence of the Babylonian Talmud, wrote:

However, on the Jerusalem Talmud’s continued importance for the understanding of arcane matters, Hai ben Sherira wrote:

In addition, the Jerusalem Talmud remains an indispensable source of knowledge of the development of the Jewish Law in the Holy Land. It was also an important resource in the study of the Babylonian Talmud by the Kairouan school of Chananel ben Chushiel and Nissim ben Jacob, with the result that opinions ultimately based on the Jerusalem Talmud found their way into both the Tosafot and the Mishneh Torah of Maimonides.

The Babylonian Talmud has traditionally been studied more widely and has had a greater influence on the halakhic tradition than the Jerusalem Talmud. However, some traditions associated with the Jerusalem Talmud are reflected in certain forms of the liturgy, particularly those of the Italian Jews and Romaniotes.

Following the formation of the modern state of Israel, there was some interest in restoring Jerusalem Talmud's traditions. For example, David Bar-Hayim of the Machon Shilo institute has issued a siddur reflecting the practices found in the Jerusalem Talmud and other sources.

Commentators 
There is no comprehensive commentary to the Jerusalem Talmud by any of the Rishonim, but explanations of many individual passages can be found in the literature of the Rishonim. Most significantly, Rabbi Samson ben Abraham of Sens (c. 1150–c. 1230), known as the Rash, excerpts and explains many sections of the Jerusalem Talmud in his commentary to the Mishnah of Seder Zeraim. His work, however, is focused on the Mishnah and is not a comprehensive commentary on the entire Jerusalem Talmud.

Judah ben Yakar (died c.1210) wrote a commentary to much of the Jerusalem Talmud, which was quoted by other rishonim but has now been lost.

Kaftor VaFerach, by Rabbi Ishtori Haparchi (1280-1355), a disciple of Rabbi Asher ben Jehiel, the Rosh, is one of the few surviving compositions of the Rishonim about all of Seder Zeraim.

Many Acharonim, however, wrote commentaries on all or major portions of the Jerusalem Talmud, and as with the Babylonian Talmud, many also wrote on individual tractates of the Jerusalem Talmud.

One of the first of the Acharonim to write a commentary on the Jerusalem Talmud was Solomon Sirilio (1485–1554), also known as Rash Sirilio, whose commentaries cover only the Seder Zeraim and the tractate Shekalim of Seder Moed. Sirilio's commentary remained in manuscript form until 1875, when it was first printed in Mainz by Meir Lehmann. In the Vilna edition of the Jerusalem Talmud, Rash Sirilio appears only for tractates Berakhot and Pe'ah but the commentary for the entire Seder Zeraim appears in the Mutzal Mi’Eish edition of the Jerusalem Talmud. In addition to his commentary, Sirilio worked to remove mistakes made by manuscript copyists that over time had slipped into the text of the Jerusalem Talmud and his amended text of the Gemara is reproduced alongside his commentary in the Vilna and Mutzal Mi’Eish editions of the Jerusalem Talmud.

Today's modern printed editions almost all carry the commentaries, Korban ha-Eida, by David ben Naphtali Fränkel (c. 1704–1762) of Berlin, and Pnei Moshe, by Moses Margolies (c.1710?–1781) of Amsterdam.

A modern edition and commentary, known as Or Simchah, is currently being prepared in Beersheba; another edition in preparation, including paraphrases and explanatory notes in modern Hebrew, is Yedid Nefesh. The Jerusalem Talmud has also received some attention from Adin Steinsaltz, who planned a translation into modern Hebrew and accompanying explanation similar to his work on the Babylonian Talmud before his death. So far only Tractates Pe'ah and Shekalim have appeared.

Translations into English 
 The first volume, Berakhoth, was translated into English in 1886 by Dr. Moses Schwab, under the title "The Talmud of Jerusalem" (Available online). The author has an earlier translation into French, which covers many more volumes.
Talmud of the Land of Israel: A Preliminary Translation and Explanation Jacob Neusner, Tzvee Zahavy, others. University of Chicago Press. This translation uses a form-analytical presentation which makes the logical units of discourse easier to identify and follow.
Schottenstein Edition of the Yerushalmi Talmud Mesorah/ArtScroll. This translation is the counterpart to Mesorah/ArtScroll's Schottenstein Edition of the Babylonian Talmud (n.b. Fully translated in Hebrew and English.  The 51-Volume set is the first and only Orthodox non-academic English translation of the Jerusalem Talmud, the series was completed and available for purchase as of March 6, 2022.)
The Jerusalem Talmud ed. Heinrich Guggenheimer, Walter de Gruyter (publisher's website). This edition, which is a complete one for the entire Jerusalem Talmud, is a scholarly translation based on the editio princeps and upon the existing manuscripts. The text is fully vocalized and followed by an extensive commentary.

References

External links 

 Online Facsimile edition of the Leiden manuscript
 The Leiden manuscript of the Jerusalem Talmud (Brief Overview)
 Full Text of the Talmud Yerushalmi (Hebrew) Mechon-Mamre
 Full Text of the Talmud Yerushalmi (Hebrew) Snunit
 The Talmud Yerushalmi in 750 MP3s - from YerushalmiOnline.org
 The Talmud Yerushalmi, Jewish Encyclopedia, 1906
 Lost segment of Jerusalem Talmud unearthed in Geneva
 Daf Yomi Yerushalmi calendar

 
Jews in the Land of Israel
Jews and Judaism in the Roman Empire
Jews and Judaism in the Byzantine Empire